Our Lady of Sorrows High School, commonly called Sorrows, was a coeducational Catholic high school in Farmington, Michigan, United States.  It closed in 1971.

References

Defunct Catholic secondary schools in Michigan